Victoria University of Wellington has conferred the following honorary doctorates:

References

 
Victoria
Victoria University of Wellington
Victoria University of Wellington